Do It Again: A Tribute to Pet Sounds is a tribute album released on November 14, 2006. It consists of various artists' cover versions of tracks from the Beach Boys' 1966 album Pet Sounds.

Reception

Record Collectors Jason Draper wrote that "there’s no exquisite harmonies, meticulous arrangements or attention to detail, but for the most part, everyone follows the script. ... Fans of the original will run screaming, but students who know their left-of-centre artists will find something to embrace."

Track listing

See also
List of cover versions of Beach Boys songs

References

The Beach Boys tribute albums
2006 compilation albums